Hyalurga rica is a moth of the family Erebidae. It was described by Jacob Hübner in 1831. It is found on Cuba.

References

 

Hyalurga
Moths described in 1831